Malyovitsa Crag (Malyovishki Kamak \ma-'lyo-vish-ki 'ka-m&k\) is a rocky peak rising to 290 m in the east extremity of Delchev Ridge, Tangra Mountains on Livingston Island in the South Shetland Islands, Antarctica.  Surmounting Sopot Ice Piedmont to the west.  The peak is named after Malyovitsa Peak in Rila Mountain, western Bulgaria.

Location

Map
 L.L. Ivanov. Antarctica: Livingston Island and Greenwich, Robert, Snow and Smith Islands. Scale 1:120000 topographic map.  Troyan: Manfred Wörner Foundation, 2009.

References
 Malyovitsa Crag. SCAR Composite Antarctic Gazetteer
 Bulgarian Antarctic Gazetteer. Antarctic Place-names Commission. (details in Bulgarian, basic data in English)

External links
 Malyovitsa Crag. Copernix satellite image

Tangra Mountains